Edward Hardman (1741-1814) was an Irish politician. Ball was educated at Trinity College, Dublin.  From 1801 to 1806, he was MP for Drogheda in the House of Commons of the United Kingdom.

References

Alumni of Trinity College Dublin
18th-century Irish people
Irish MPs 1790–1797
Irish MPs 1798–1800
Members of the Parliament of the United Kingdom for County Louth constituencies (1801–1922)
1741 births
1814 deaths
People from Drogheda